This is a list of foreign ministers in 1996.

Africa
 Algeria -
Mohamed Salah Dembri (1993-1996)
Ahmed Attaf (1996-1999)
 Angola - Venâncio da Silva Moura (1992-1999)
 Benin -
Edgar Yves Monnou (1995-1996)
Pierre Osho (1996-1998)
 Botswana - Mompati Merafhe (1994-2008)
 Burkina Faso - Ablassé Ouedraogo (1994-1999)
 Burundi -
Vénérand Bakevyumusaya (1995-1996)
Luc Rukingama (1996-1998)
 Cameroon - Ferdinand Oyono (1992-1997)
 Cape Verde -
José Tomás Veiga (1995-1996)
Amílcar Spencer Lopes (1996-1998)
 Central African Republic -
Simon Bedaya-Ngaro (1993-1996)
Michel Gbezera-Bria (1996-1997)
 Chad -
Ahmat Abderahmane Haggar (1994-1996)
Saleh Kebzabo (1996-1997)
 Comoros -
Abdallah Mouzaoir (1995-1996)
Said Omar Said Ahmed (1996-1997)
 Congo - Arsène Tsaty Boungou (1995-1997)
 Côte d'Ivoire - Amara Essy (1990-2000)
 Djibouti - Mohamed Moussa Chehem (1995-1999)
 Egypt - Amr Moussa (1991-2001)
 Equatorial Guinea - Miguel Oyono Ndong Mifumu (1993-1999)
 Eritrea - Petros Solomon (1994-1997)
 Ethiopia - Seyoum Mesfin (1991-2010)
 Gabon - Casimir Oyé-Mba (1994-1999)
 The Gambia - Baboucarr-Blaise Jagne (1995-1997)
 Ghana - Obed Asamoah (1981-1997)
 Guinea -
Kozo Zoumanigui (1994-1996)
Lamine Camara (1996-1999)
 Guinea-Bissau -
Ansumane Mané (1995-1996)
Fernando Delfim da Silva (1996-1999)
 Kenya - Kalonzo Musyoka (1993-1998)
 Lesotho - Kelebone Maope (1995-1998)
 Liberia -
Momolu Sirleaf (1995-1996)
Monie Captan (1996-2003)
 Libya - Umar Mustafa al-Muntasir (1992-2000)
 Madagascar -
Jacques Sylla (1993-1996)
Evariste Marson (1996-1997)
 Malawi -
Edward Bwanali (1994-1996)
George Ntafu (1996-1997)
 Mali - Dioncounda Traoré (1994-1997)
 Mauritania -
Mohamed Salem Ould Lekhal (1994-1996)
Lemrabott Sidi Mahmoud Ould Cheikh Ahmed (1996-1997)
 Mauritius - Paul Bérenger (1995-1997)
 Morocco - Abdellatif Filali (1985-1999)
 Western Sahara - Malainine Sadik (1995-1997)
 Mozambique - Leonardo Simão (1994-2005)
 Namibia - Theo-Ben Gurirab (1990-2002)
 Niger -
Mohamed Bazoum (1995-1996)
André Salifou (1996)
Ibrahim Hassane Mayaki (1996-1997)
 Nigeria - Tom Ikimi (1995-1998)
 Rwanda - Anastase Gasana (1994-1999)
 São Tomé and Príncipe -
Guilherme Posser da Costa (1994-1996)
Homero Jeronimo Salvaterra (1996-1999)
 Senegal - Moustapha Niasse (1993-1998)
 Seychelles - Danielle de St. Jorre (1989-1997)
 Sierra Leone -
Alusine Fofanah (1995-1996)
Louisin Chaluba (1996)
Maigore Kallon (1996)
Shirley Gbujama (1996-1997)
 Somalia - Abdullahi Sheikh Ismail (?1996?)
 Somaliland - Sulayman Mahmud Adan (1996)
 South Africa - Alfred Baphethuxolo Nzo (1994-1999)
 Sudan - Ali Osman Taha (1995-1998)
 Swaziland - Arthur Khoza (1995-1998)
 Tanzania - Jakaya Kikwete (1995-2006)
 Togo -
Barry Moussa Barqué (1995-1996)
Koffi Panou (1996-1998)
 Tunisia - Habib Ben Yahia (1991-1997)
 Uganda -
Ruhakana Rugunda (1994-1996)
Eriya Kategaya (1996-2001)
 Zaire -
Gérard Kamanda Wa Kamanda (1995-1996)
Jean-Marie Kititwa (1996)
Gérard Kamanda Wa Kamanda (1996-1997)
 Zambia -
Christon Tembo (1995-1996)
Lawrence Shimba (1996-1997)
 Zimbabwe - Stan Mudenge (1995-2005)

Asia
 Afghanistan -
Najibullah Lafraie (1994-1996)
Abdul Rahim Ghafoorzai (1996)
Mohammad Ghous (1996-1997)
 Armenia -
Vahan Papasyan (1993-1996)
Alexander Arzumanyan (1996-1998)
 Azerbaijan - Hasan Hasanov (1993-1998)
 Nagorno-Karabakh - Arkadi Ghukasyan (1993-1997)
 Bahrain - Sheikh Muhammad ibn Mubarak ibn Hamad Al Khalifah (1971-2005)
 Bangladesh -
A.S.M. Mostafizur Rahman (1991-1996)
Mohammad Habibur Rahman (1996)
Abdus Samad Azad (1996-2001)
 Bhutan - Dawa Tsering (1972-1998)
 Brunei - Pengiran Muda Mohamed Bolkiah (1984–2015)
 Cambodia - Ung Huot (1994-1998)
 China - Qian Qichen (1988-1998)
 Georgia - Irakli Menagarishvili (1995-2003)
 Abkhazia -
 Leonid Lakerbaia (1995-1996)
 Konstantin Ozgan (1996-1997)
 India -
Pranab Mukherjee (1995-1996)
Atal Bihari Vajpayee (1996)
Sikander Bakht (1996)
I. K. Gujral (1996-1998)
 Indonesia - Ali Alatas (1988-1999)
 Iran - Ali Akbar Velayati (1981-1997)
 Iraq - Muhammad Saeed al-Sahhaf (1992-2001)
 Israel -
Ehud Barak (1995-1996)
David Levy (1996-1998)
 Japan -
Yōhei Kōno (1994-1996)
Yukihiko Ikeda (1996-1997)
 Jordan - Abdul Karim al-Kabariti (1995-1997)
 Kazakhstan - Kassym-Jomart Tokayev (1994-1999)
 North Korea - Kim Yong-nam (1983-1998)
 South Korea -
Gong Ro-myeong (1994-1996)
Yu Jong-ha (1996-1998)
 Kuwait - Sheikh Sabah Al-Ahmad Al-Jaber Al-Sabah (1978-2003)
 Kyrgyzstan - Roza Otunbayeva (1994-1997)
 Laos - Somsavat Lengsavad (1993-2006)
 Lebanon - Farès Boueiz (1992-1998)
 Malaysia - Abdullah Ahmad Badawi (1991-1999)
 Maldives - Fathulla Jameel (1978-2005)
 Mongolia -
Tserenpiliyn Gombosüren (1988-1996)
Mendsaikhany Enkhsaikhan (1996-1997)
 Myanmar - Ohn Gyaw (1991-1998)
 Nepal - Prakash Chandra Lohani (1995-1997)
 Oman - Yusuf bin Alawi bin Abdullah (1982–2020)
 Pakistan -
Aseff Ahmad Ali (1993-1996)
Sahabzada Yaqub Khan (1996-1997)
 Philippines - Domingo Siazon, Jr. (1995-2001)
 Qatar - Sheikh Hamad bin Jassim bin Jaber Al Thani (1992-2013)
 Saudi Arabia - Prince Saud bin Faisal bin Abdulaziz Al Saud (1975–2015)
 Singapore - S. Jayakumar (1994-2004)
 Sri Lanka - Lakshman Kadirgamar (1994-2001)
 Syria - Farouk al-Sharaa (1984-2006)
 Taiwan -
Fredrick Chien (1990-1996)
John Chiang (1996-1997)
 Tajikistan - Talbak Nazarov (1994-2006)
 Thailand -
Kasem S. Kasemsri (1995-1996)
Amnuay Viravan (1996)
Thepkamol Devakula (acting) (1996)
Prachuab Chaiyasan (1996-1997)
 Turkey -
Deniz Baykal (1995-1996)
Emre Gönensay (1996)
Tansu Çiller (1996-1997)
 Turkmenistan - Boris Şyhmyradow (1995-2000)
 United Arab Emirates - Rashid Abdullah Al Nuaimi (1980-2006)
 Uzbekistan - Abdulaziz Komilov (1994-2003)
 Vietnam - Nguyễn Mạnh Cầm (1991-2000)
 Yemen - Abd al-Karim al-Iryani (1994-1998)

Australia and Oceania
 Australia -
Gareth Evans (1988-1996)
Alexander Downer (1996-2007)
 Fiji - Filipe Bole (1994-1997)
 Kiribati - Teburoro Tito (1994-2003)
 Marshall Islands - Phillip H. Muller (1994-2000)
 Micronesia -
Resio S. Moses (1991-1996)
Asterio R. Takesy (1996-1997)
 Nauru -
Lagumot Harris (1995-1996)
Bernard Dowiyogo (1996)
Kennan Adeang (1996)
Rueben Kun (1996-1997)
 New Zealand - Don McKinnon (1990-1999)
 Cook Islands - Inatio Akaruru (1989-1999)
 Palau - Andres Uherbelau (1994-1996)
 Papua New Guinea -
Sir Julius Chan (1994-1996)
Kilroy Genia (1996-1997)
 Solomon Islands -
Danny Philip (1995-1996)
David Sitai (1996-1997)
 Tonga - Prince Tupouto'a Tungi (1979-1998)
 Tuvalu -
Kamuta Latasi (1993-1996)
Bikenibeu Paeniu (1996-1999)
 Vanuatu -
Alfred Maseng (1995-1996)
Amos Bangabiti (1996)
Willie Jimmy (1996-1997)
 Western Samoa - Tofilau Eti Alesana (1988-1998)

Europe
 Albania -
Alfred Serreqi (1992-1996)
Tritan Shehu (1996-1997)
 Andorra - Manuel Mas Ribó (1994-1997)
 Austria - Wolfgang Schüssel (1995-2000)
 Belarus - Uladzimir Syanko (1994-1997)
 Belgium - Erik Derycke (1995-1999)
 Brussels-Capital Region - Jos Chabert (1989-1999)
 Flanders - Luc Van den Brande (1992-1999)
 Wallonia -
 Jean-Pierre Grafé (1995-1996)
 William Ancion (1996-1999)
 Bosnia and Herzegovina -
Muhamed Sacirbey (1995-1996)
Jadranko Prlić (1996-2001)
Republika Srpska - Aleksa Buha (1992-1998)
 Bulgaria -
Georgi Pirinski, Jr. (1995-1996)
Irina Bokova (acting) (1996-1997)
 Croatia - Mate Granić (1993-2000)
 Cyprus - Alekos Michaelides (1993-1997)
 Northern Cyprus -
 Atay Ahmet Raşit (1994-1996)
 Taner Etkin (1996-1998)
 Czech Republic - Josef Zieleniec (1992-1997)
 Denmark - Niels Helveg Petersen (1993-2000)
 Estonia -
Siim Kallas (1995-1996)
Toomas Hendrik Ilves (1996-1998)
 Finland - Tarja Halonen (1995-2000)
 France - Hervé de Charette (1995-1997)
 Germany - Klaus Kinkel (1992-1998)
 Greece -
Karolos Papoulias (1993-1996)
Theodoros Pangalos (1996-1999)
 Hungary - László Kovács (1994-1998)
 Iceland - Halldór Ásgrímsson (1995-2004)
 Ireland - Dick Spring (1994-1997)
 Italy -
Susanna Agnelli (1995-1996)
Lamberto Dini (1996-2001)
 Latvia - Valdis Birkavs (1994-1999)
 Liechtenstein - Andrea Willi (1993-2001)
 Lithuania -
Povilas Gylys (1992-1996)
Algirdas Saudargas (1996-2000)
 Luxembourg - Jacques Poos (1984-1999)
 Macedonia -
Stevo Crvenkovski (1993-1996)
Ljubomir Frckovski (1996-1997)
 Malta -
Guido de Marco (1989-1996)
George Vella (1996-1998)
 Moldova - Mihai Popov (1994-1997)
 Netherlands - Hans van Mierlo (1994-1998)
 Norway - Bjørn Tore Godal (1994-1997)
 Poland - Dariusz Rosati (1995-1997)
 Portugal - Jaime Gama (1995-2002)
 Romania -
Teodor Meleşcanu (1992-1996)
Adrian Severin (1996-1997)
 Russia -
Andrey Kozyrev (1990-1996)
Yevgeny Primakov (1996-1998)
 Chechnya -
 Shamseddin Yusef (1992-1996)
 Ruslan Chimayev (1996-1997)
 San Marino - Gabriele Gatti (1986-2002)
 Slovakia -
Juraj Schenk (1994-1996)
Pavol Hamžík (1996-1997)
 Slovenia -
Zoran Thaler (1995-1996)
Davorin Kračun (1996-1997)
 Spain -
Carlos Westendorp (1995-1996)
Abel Matutes (1996-2000)
 Sweden - Lena Hjelm-Wallén (1994-1998)
 Switzerland - Flavio Cotti (1993-1999)
 Ukraine - Hennadiy Udovenko (1994-1998)
 United Kingdom - Malcolm Rifkind (1995-1997)
 Vatican City - Archbishop Jean-Louis Tauran (1990-2003)
 Yugoslavia - Milan Milutinović (1995-1998)
 Montenegro - Janko Jeknić (1995-1997)

North America and the Caribbean
 Antigua and Barbuda - Lester Bird (1991-2004)
 The Bahamas - Janet Bostwick (1994-2002)
 Barbados - Billie Miller (1994-2008)
 Belize - Dean Barrow (1993-1998)
 Canada -
André Ouellet (1993-1996)
Lloyd Axworthy (1996-2000)
 Quebec -
 Bernard Landry (1994-1996)
 Sylvain Simard (1996-1998)
 Costa Rica - Fernando Naranjo Villalobos (1994-1998)
 Cuba - Roberto Robaina (1993-1999)
 Dominica - Edison James (1995-1998)
 Dominican Republic -
Carlos Morales Troncoso (1994-1996)
Eduardo Latorre Rodríguez (1996-2000)
 El Salvador - Ramón Ernesto González Giner (1995-1999)
 Grenada - Keith Mitchell (1995-1997)
 Guatemala -
Alejandro Maldonado Aguirre (1995-1996)
Eduardo Stein (1996-2000)
 Haiti - Fritz Longchamp (1995-2001)
 Honduras - Delmer Urbizo Panting (1995-1998)
 Jamaica - Seymour Mullings (1995-2000)
 Mexico - José Ángel Gurría (1994-1998)
 Nicaragua - Ernesto Leal (1992-1997)
 Panama -
Gabriel Lewis Galindo (1994-1996)
Ricardo Alberto Arias (1996-1998)
 Puerto Rico – Norma Burgos (1995–1999)
 Saint Kitts and Nevis - Denzil Douglas (1995-2000)
 Saint Lucia -
George Mallet (1992-1996)
Vaughan Lewis (1996-1997)
 Saint Vincent and the Grenadines - Alpian Allen (1994-1998)
 Trinidad and Tobago - Ralph Maraj (1995-2000)
 United States - Warren Christopher (1993-1997)

South America
 Argentina - Guido di Tella (1991-1999)
 Bolivia - Antonio Araníbar Quiroga (1993-1997)
 Brazil - Luiz Felipe Palmeira Lampreia (1995-2001)
 Chile - José Miguel Insulza (1994-1999)
 Colombia -
Rodrigo Pardo García-Peña (1994-1996)
María Emma Mejía Vélez (1996-1998)
 Ecuador - Galo Leoro Franco (1994-1997)
 Guyana - Clement Rohee (1992-2001)
 Paraguay -
Luis María Ramírez Boettner (1993-1996)
Rubén Melgarejo Lanzoni (1996-1998)
 Peru - Francisco Tudela (1995-1997)
 Suriname -
Subhas Mungra (1991-1996)
Faried Pierkhan (1996-1997)
 Uruguay - Álvaro Ramos Trigo (1995-1998)
 Venezuela - Miguel Ángel Burelli Rivas (1994-1999)

1996 in international relations
Foreign ministers
1996